The International Peace Bureau (IPB), founded in 1891, is one of the world's oldest international peace federations. The organisation was awarded the Nobel Peace Prize in 1910 for acting "as a link between the peace societies of the various countries". In 1913, Henri La Fontaine was also awarded the Prize "[For his work as] head of the International Peace Bureau". , eleven other Nobel Peace Prize laureates have been members of the IPB.  

Its membership consists of 300 organizations in 70 countries. IPB's headquarters are located in Berlin, Germany, with offices in Barcelona, Spain, and Geneva, Switzerland. Prior to 2017, the headquarters were in Geneva. 

Its main programmes are the Global Campaign on Military Spending (GCOMS) and disarmament for sustainable development, which focuses both on nuclear and conventional weapons, as well as biological weapons, landmines, and small arms.

IPB holds Consultative Status with the United Nations Economic and Social Council (ECOSOC) and associate status with the United Nations Department of Global Communications.

IPB was founded under the name Permanent International Peace Bureau (Bureau International Permanent de la Paix). From 1912 onward it used the name International Peace Bureau. Between 1946 and 1961, it was known under the name International Liaison Committee of Organizations for Peace – ILCOP (Comité de liaison international des organisations de paix – CLIOP).

Global Campaign on Military Spending 
The Global Campaign on Military Spending (GCOMS) is a permanent, global, year-round campaign that was created in December 2014 by the IPB to tackle the worldwide issue of excessive military spending.

The aim of the campaign is to pressure the world's governments to invest money in the sectors of health, education, employment and climate change rather than military. It also calls for an annual, minimum reallocation of 10% from the military budgets of all states. Finally, it advocates the reduction of arms production and international weapons trade.

The campaign organises the Global Day of Action on Military Spending (GDAMS) to bring public, media and political attention to the costs of military spending and the need to invest in new priorities.

GCOMS is managed from the decentralised Barcelona, Spain, office of IPB in coordination with Centre Delàs of Peace Studies. More than 100 organisations from 35 countries have joined the campaign.

Nuclear disarmament activism 
IPB has been in the forefront of nuclear disarmament activities since 1945, including:

 Treaty on the Non-Proliferation of Nuclear Weapons (NPT)
 Comprehensive Nuclear-Test-Ban Treaty (CTBT)
 World Court Project
 Treaty on the Prohibition of Nuclear Weapons (TPNW)

Currently, the IPB is campaigning to encourage the signing and ratification of the TPNW so that it may enter into force.

Seán MacBride Peace Prize 
Established in 1992, the Seán MacBride Peace Prize is awarded by the International Peace Bureau to a person or organisation that "has done outstanding work for peace, disarmament and/or human rights." It is named after Seán MacBride, a Nobel Peace Prize winner who was chairman of the IPB from 1968 to 1974 and president from 1974 to 1985.

Recipients
The following are the recipients of the Seán MacBride Peace Prize since its inception in 1992:

Leadership 
At the Triennial Assembly held in Ghent on October 15 2022, a new group of IPB officials was elected.

President 
The current co-presidents are:

Treasurer 
The current Treasurer is:

Vice-presidents 
The vice-presidents deputise for the president when necessary. The current vice-presidents are:

Board members 
The board members are the following:

Council members 
The Council members are the following persons:

Staff  
The staff members are the following persons:

Nobel Peace Prizes 
IPB's work was rewarded by the Nobel Peace Prize in 1910, which has also been awarded to some of its members:
 1901 : Frédéric Passy (France), IPB council member
 1902 : Élie Ducommun and Albert Gobat (Switzerland), first honorary secretaries of IPB
 1905 : Bertha von Suttner (Austria), writer and honorary vice-president of IPB
 1907 : Ernesto Moneta (Italy), IPB council member
 1908 : Fredrik Bajer (Denmark), honorary president of IPB
 1910 : The International Peace Bureau
 1911 : Alfred Fried (Austria), IPB council member
 1913 : Henri La Fontaine (Belgium), president of IPB
 1927 : Ludwig Quidde (Germany), IPB council member
 1959 : Philip Noel-Baker (United Kingdom), IPB vice-president
 1962 : Linus Pauling (United States), IPB vice-president
 1974 : Seán MacBride (Ireland), IPB chairman and president
 1982 : Alva Myrdal (Sweden), IPB vice-president

Presidents 
The IPB has a co-president system that ensures a gender-balance among leadership. Each president can currently serve up to two terms of three years.
Henri La Fontaine – 1907–1943
Ernst Wolf – 1963–1974
Seán MacBride – 1974–1985
Bruce Kent – 1985–1992
Maj Britt Theorin – 1992–2000
Cora Weiss – 2000–2006
Tomas Magnusson – 2006–2013
Ingeborg Breines – 2009–2016
Reiner Braun – 2013–2019
Lisa Clark – 2016–2022
Philip Jennings – 2019–present
Corazon Valdez Fabros 2022-present

See also 
 The Castle of Peace / Society of Peace
 Fredrik Bajer
 Élie Ducommun
 Charles Albert Gobat
 Henri La Fontaine
 Bertha von Suttner
 List of anti-war organizations
 List of peace activists

References

Sources 
Gobat, Albert, Développement du Bureau international permanent de la paix. Bern, 1910.
Herz, Ulrich, The International Peace Bureau: History, Aims, Activities. Geneva, 1969.
From Nobel Lectures, Peace 1901-1925, Editor Frederick W. Haberman, Elsevier Publishing Company, Amsterdam, 1972.

External links 

 
 GCOMS website
 

Organizations awarded Nobel Peace Prizes
Peace organisations based in Germany
Organizations established in 1891
1891 establishments in Switzerland
Organisations based in Bern
Swiss Nobel laureates
International Campaign to Abolish Nuclear Weapons